Old Furnace is a village in the town of Hardwick, Worcester County, Massachusetts, United States, about 20 miles northwest of the city of Worcester.

Villages in Worcester County, Massachusetts
Villages in Massachusetts